Ship in Distress may refer to:

 Ship in Distress (1925 film), a German silent drama film
 Ship in Distress (1929 film), a German silent drama film

See also 

 Place of refuge for ships